UDP-2,4-diacetamido-2,4,6-trideoxy-beta-L-altropyranose hydrolase (PseG, UDP-6-deoxy-AltdiNAc hydrolase, Cj1312) is an enzyme with systematic name UDP-2,4-bis(acetamido)-2,4,6-trideoxy-beta-L-altropyranose hydrolase. This enzyme catalyses the following chemical reaction

 UDP-2,4-bis(acetamido)-2,4,6-trideoxy-beta-L-altropyranose + H2O  2,4-bis(acetamido)-2,4,6-trideoxy-beta-L-altropyranose + UDP

The enzyme is involved in biosynthesis of pseudaminic acid.

References

External links 
 

EC 3.6.1